Germany (GER) participated in the inaugural Paralympic Games in 1960 in Rome, where it sent a delegation of nine athletes. The country, since 1949 officially the Federal Republic of Germany (FRG), was until 1990 also called West Germany while the separate East German Democratic Republic (GDR) existed, which was recognized by the IOC only after 1964. East German athletes, however, participated in the Paralympics for the first and last time in 1984. Following the reunification of Germany in 1990, athletes from all of Germany compete simply as Germany (GER) again.

Germany has participated in every edition of the Summer Paralympics, and has also taken part in every edition of the Winter Paralympics, from the first in 1976. Germany was the host country of the 1972 Summer Paralympics, in Heidelberg.

East Germany, West Germany and Germany have won a total of 1915 Paralympic medals, of which 658 gold, 649 silver and 609 bronze. This is more than any country other than the United States and Great Britain. The International Paralympic Committee, however, maintains separate records for "West Germany" (1960–88) and "Germany" (1992–present), due to their separate IPC codes, giving West Germany a total of 938 medals (354 golds), and Germany a total of 973 (304 golds). This places the "two countries" seventh and eighth, respectively, on the all-time Paralympic Games medal table - behind the United States, Great Britain, China, Canada, Australia, and France.

Germany has consistently been one of the world's strongest nations at the Paralympics. Prior to 2008, at the Summer Games, it had always been among the top ten on the medal tables, and was within the top three on six occasions. In 2008,they finished in the 11th place. At the Winter Games, Germany has always been among the top three, except in 1980 (7th), 1984 (4th) and 2018 (5th). It topped the medal table at the 1972 Summer Paralympics (which it hosted), and the 1976, 2002 and 2010 Winter Games.

Among Germany's most successful Paralympians are
 Reinhild Möller, winner of 19 medals (of which 16 gold) in alpine skiing, and 4 medals (of which 3 are gold) in athletics
 Claudia Hengst: 25 medals (of which 13 gold) in swimming
 Gerd Schönfelder: 17 medals (of which 12 gold) in alpine skiing
 Frank Höfle: 17 medals (of which 10 gold) in cross-country skiing.

Medal tallies
These tallies include the results for both "Germany" and "West Germany". They do not include the four medals of East Germany at the Paralympics.

Summer Paralympics

Winter Paralympics

Records
These records include West Germany at the Paralympics.

Summer Paralympics
Active athletes are in bold.
Multi medalists
German athletes who have won more than three golds or more than five medals.

Multi medalists at single Games
German athletes who have won more than two golds at a single Games. Categorised by medals earned, sports then year.

Multi medals at single event
German athletes who have won more than two golds at a single event in the Summer Paralympics. Categorised by medals earned, sports then gold medals earned.

Most appearances
German athletes who have competed in four or more Paralympic Games. Aged under 15 or over 40 are in bold.

Winter Paralympics
Multi medalists
German athletes who have won three gold medals or more than five medals.

Multi medals at single Games
German athletes who have won two golds in a single Games. Categorised by medals earned, sports then year.

Multi medals at single event
German athletes who have won two golds in a single event in the Winter Paralympics. Categorised by medals earned, sports then gold medals earned.

Most appearances
German athletes who have competed in four or more Winter Paralympic Games. Ages under 15 or over 40 are in bold.

See also
 Germany at the Olympics
 East Germany at the Paralympics
 All-time Paralympic Games medal table

References